Kalliope (minor planet designation: 22 Kalliope) is a large M-type asteroid from the asteroid belt discovered by J. R. Hind on 16 November 1852. It is named after Calliope, the Greek Muse of epic poetry. It is orbited by a small moon named Linus.

Characteristics

Kalliope is somewhat elongated, approximately 166 km in diameter, and slightly asymmetric, as evidenced by resolved images taken with the VLT at the European Southern Observatory. This new diameter, which was measured by observing mutual eclipses of Kalliope and Linus, is 8% smaller than that calculated from IRAS observations.

The spectrum of Kalliope is an M-type, indicating that its surface may be partially composed of iron–nickel metal. The asteroid's density is about 3.4 g/cm3. Since the asteroid is likely to be a rubble pile, accounting for a possible porosity of 20–40% leads to the material density of 4.2–5.8 g/cm3, which means that Kalliope is probably made of a mixture of metal with silicates. Spectroscopic studies have shown, however, evidence of hydrated minerals and silicates, which indicate rather a stony surface composition. Kalliope also has a low radar albedo, which is inconsistent with a purely metallic surface.

Lightcurve analysis indicates that Kalliope's pole most likely points towards ecliptic coordinates (β, λ) = (−23°, 20°) with a 10° uncertainty, which gives Kalliope an axial tilt of 103°. Kalliope's rotation is then slightly retrograde.

Between 2004 and 2021, 22 Kalliope has been observed to occult fifteen stars.

Satellite
Kalliope has one known natural satellite, called Linus or (22) Kalliope I Linus. It is quite large about 28 km in diameter and would be a sizeable asteroid by itself. It orbits about 1100 km from the center of Kalliope, equivalent to about 13.2 Kalliope radii. Linus was discovered on 29 August 2001 by Jean-Luc Margot and Michael E. Brown, while another team led by William Merline also independently detected the moon 3 days later.

First stellar occultation
On 7 November 2006, the first stellar occultation by the satellite of an asteroid (Linus) was successfully observed by a group of Japanese observers according to a prediction that was made just one day before by Berthier et al. based on more than 5 years of regular observations of Kalliope binary system using adaptive optics systems on ground-based telescopes. The observed chords of Linus give a unique opportunity to estimate the size of the moonlet which was estimated to 20–28 km.

References

External links 
 Lightcurve plot of 22 Kalliope, Palmer Divide Observatory, B. D. Warner (2007)
 orbit diagram for Linus
 A different VLT image of Kalliope and Linus
 (22) Kalliope, datasheet, johnstonsarchive.net
 Asteroids with Satellites, Robert Johnston, johnstonsarchive.net
 , Prediction and Reduction of Stellar Occultations of Binary Asteroids
 
 

Background asteroids
Kalliope
Kalliope
Binary asteroids
M-type asteroids (Tholen)
X-type asteroids (SMASS)
18521116